Closterotomus ventralis is a species of plant bugs belonging to the family Miridae, subfamily Mirinae.

Distribution
This species can be found in the southern Europe (Bulgaria, France, Greece, Italy, North Macedonia, Romania, Slovenia and Spain).

Description
Body is mainly black. Are also black the head and the antennae. The second antennal segment is larger in the distal part. Legs are reddish or brown-red.

Biology
These bugs feed on Rubus species.

References 

Kerzhner I.M. & Josifov M. - Family Miridae in Catalogue of the Heteroptera of the Palaearctic Region 3: 1-446. 1999

External links
 Galerie-insecte
 Insectarium virtual

Hemiptera of Europe
Insects described in 1879
Mirini